The 2001 Euro Beach Soccer Cup, was the third Euro Beach Soccer Cup, one of Europe's two major beach soccer championships at the time, held in February 2001, in Maspalomas, Spain. Portugal won the championship, with hosts Spain finishing second. Italy beat Germany in the third place playoff to finish third and fourth respectively, replicating the result of the 1998 Euro Beach Soccer Cup.

Eight teams participated in the tournament who played in a straightforward knockout tournament, starting with the quarterfinals, with extra matches deciding the nations who finished in fifth, sixth, seventh and eighth place

Participating nations

Matches

Main tournament

Fifth to eighth place deciding matches
The following matches took place between the losing nations, in the quarterfinals, to determine the final standings of the nations finishing in fifth to eighth place. The semifinals took place on the same day of the semifinals of the main tournament, and the playoffs took place on the day of the final.

Winners

Final standings

References

Euro Beach Soccer Cup
2001 in beach soccer